The 1993–94 Anglo-Italian Cup was the sixth Anglo-Italian Cup competition. The European football competition was played between eight clubs from England and eight clubs from Italy. Italian side Brescia lifted the trophy after beating English side Notts County 1–0.

Qualifying round

Group 1

Group 2

Group 3

Group 4

Group 5

Group 6

Group 7

Group 8

Group stage

Group A matches

Group A table

Group B matches

Group B table

Semi-finals
 English semi-final

 Italian semi-final

Brescia win on away goal rule

Final

References

Anglo-Italian Cup
Anglo-Italian Cup
Anglo-Italian Cup